Matthew Beers (born 10 January 1994) is a South African cyclist, who specializes in cross-country mountain biking. He notably won the 2021 Cape Epic with	Jordan Sarrou.

Major results

Mountain Bike
2018
 2nd Cross-country, National Championships
2019
 1st  African classification, Cape Epic (with Alan Hatherly)
2020
 2nd Cross-country, National Championships
2021
 1st  Overall Cape Epic (with Jordan Sarrou)
1st Prologue & Stage 2
 1st  Marathon, National Championships
2022
 3rd Overall Cape Epic (with Christopher Blevins)
2023
 1st Prologue Cape Epic (with Christopher Blevins)

Road
2018
 1st Overall 
2019
 1st Overall 
2021
 2nd Time trial, National Road Championships

References

External links
 

1994 births
Living people
South African male cyclists
South African mountain bikers